Danielle Grace Kang (born October 20, 1992) is an American professional golfer currently playing on the LPGA Tour. As an amateur, she won the U.S. Women's Amateur twice, in 2010 and 2011. She won the 2017 KPMG Women's PGA Championship, an LPGA major.

Early life, college and amateur career
Kang was born on October 20, 1992 in San Francisco. She grew up in Southern California, and qualified for the U.S. Women's Open as a 14-year-old in 2007. She began high school at Oak Park High School and later transferred to Westlake High School early to begin college at Pepperdine University in Malibu in the spring of 2010. Kang played extensively as a junior golfer with the Southern California PGA Junior Tour alongside fellow SCPGA alumni such as Lizette Salas and Brianna Do.

Kang played on the Pepperdine golf team through the regular season in the spring of 2011. She was ruled academically ineligible to compete in the 2011 NCAA post-season and stated that she was not disappointed because "Pepperdine is in the past for me. I'm focusing on the future. Turning pro after the U.S. Women's Amateur."

Kang won the U.S. Women's Amateur in 2010 and competed in all four majors as an amateur in 2011. She made the cut in three of the majors, including the LPGA Championship, where she was the only non-professional in the field. Kang was the low amateur at the Women's British Open, finishing in a tie for 49th place. She repeated her win at the U.S. Women's Amateur in 2011 in August to become the first player in 15 years to win consecutive titles.

Professional career
Kang played her first tournament as a professional at the Walmart NW Arkansas Championship, in September 2011. She entered on a sponsor's exemption and missed the cut. Kang entered the 2011 LPGA Qualifying School. She survived Stage II, shooting +5 (73-74-71-75=293), just inside the cut line to qualify for the final stage. She finished the final stage, Stage III, of Q-School tied for 39th. This gave her conditional status (Priority List Category 20) on the LPGA Tour for 2012

Kang played 19 events on the LPGA Tour in 2012, making 13 cuts and finishing the season with $239,184 in earnings, putting her 52nd on the official LPGA season-ending money list. This qualified her for full status on the LPGA Tour in 2013.

Kang earned her first LPGA Tour win, 2017 KPMG Women's PGA Championship, in her 144th LPGA Tour start. On October 21, 2018, Kang won the inaugural Buick LPGA Shanghai tournament by two strokes to earn her second career victory. The tournament was held at Qizhong Garden Golf Club in Shanghai, China. In October 2019, Kang repeated as champion of the Buick LPGA Shanghai.

On August 2, 2020, Kang won the LPGA Drive On Championship at Inverness Club in Ohio. This was the LPGA's first tournament back after a six-month hiatus due to the COVID-19 pandemic. One week later, Kang won her 5th LPGA Tour event at the Marathon Classic.

Kang won the 2020 Vare Trophy for lowest scoring average on the LPGA Tour.

On January 23, 2022, Kang won the Hilton Grand Vacations Tournament of Champions at Lake Nona Golf & Country Club in Orlando, Florida.

Kang narrowly missed a rare back-to-back wins starting a new LPGA season, when her longtime friend Lydia Ko beat her by one stroke in the January 27–30 Gainbridge LPGA at Boca Rio tournament. They were tied at 12-under after the 14th hole in the fourth round, when Ko made a birdie at the 15th to take the lead, and both birdied the 16th; then both parred the final two holes. She earned $184,255 to Ko's $300,000.

Kang stopped playing on the tour after announcing at the end of the 2022 U.S. Women's Open on June 5, she had a tumor on her spine. She returned to competition at the CP Women's Open on August 25, after treatment.

Personal life
Kang is a Korean-American born to South Korean parents K.S. Kang and Grace Lee. Her brother Alex played golf for San Diego State. In 2018, she began a relationship with professional golfer Maverick McNealy, who also lives in Las Vegas, but this relationship ended in 2021.

Professional wins (6)

LPGA Tour wins (6)

LPGA Tour playoff record (0–3)

Major championships

Wins (1)

Results timeline
Results not in chronological order before 2018.

^ The Evian Championship was added as a major in 2013.

CUT = missed the half-way cut
NT = no tournament
T = tied

Summary

Most consecutive cuts made – 7 (2020 ANA – 2021 WPGA)
Longest streak of top-10s – 1 (five times)

LPGA Tour career summary

 official as of 2022 season
* Includes matchplay and other events without a cut.

World ranking
Position in Women's World Golf Rankings at the end of each calendar year.

^ as of March 6, 2023

U.S. national team appearances
Amateur
Espirito Santo Trophy: 2010

Professional
Solheim Cup: 2017 (winners), 2019, 2021

Solheim Cup record

References

External links

Danielle Kang results at Yahoo! Sports
Profile at Pepperdine Athletics site

American female golfers
LPGA Tour golfers
Winners of LPGA major golf championships
Solheim Cup competitors for the United States
Winners of ladies' major amateur golf championships
Olympic golfers of the United States
Golfers at the 2020 Summer Olympics
Pepperdine Waves women's golfers
Golfers from San Francisco
American sportspeople of Korean descent
People from Thousand Oaks, California
Sportspeople from Ventura County, California
1992 births
Living people
20th-century American women
21st-century American women